Levern Donaline Spencer, SLMM (born 23 June 1984 in Cacao Babonneau, Castries) is a Saint Lucian retired athlete and high jumper. Spencer was a four-time Olympian for Saint Lucia and competed in eight World Championships. She was also a gold medalist at both the Commonwealth Games and Pan-American Games.

Biography

Early career 
Born in Castries, Spencer attended the University of Georgia in the United States. She earned a bachelor's degree from Georgia in Health Promotion and Behavior, having first embarked upon a course of study in computer science. She competed at several CARIFTA Games, bringing home gold in 2001. That same year, she earned the bronze medal at the World Youth Championships in Athletics in Debrecen, Hungary, jumping 1.81 m. Earlier in the season, she sailed over 1.84 m, a Saint Lucian national record.

In 2002, she won silver medal behind Jamaica's Shaunette Davindson at the CARIFTA Games. Later that year, she finished in eighth place at the World Junior Championships with 1.83 m, far from the winner, Croatia's Blanka Vlašić. At the end of the season, Spencer made her first appearance at the Commonwealth Games, ending in 12th place with a jump of 1.74 m.

In 2003, she bettered her national record and personal best, clearing 1.86 m twice. Still a junior athlete, she made the final at the Pan American Games and ended in fifth place. In 2004, she jumped 1.88 m.

2005 was a breakthrough year for Spencer. After turning 21, she won her first major title at the Central American and Caribbean Championships by clearing a new personal best and national record of 1.94 m. This result earned her a spot in the 2005 World Championships in Athletics. She was eliminated from competition in the qualifying round, only recording 1.84 m.

In 2006, she took gold at the NACAC Under-23 Championships and won bronze at the Central American and Caribbean Games. At the Commonwealth Games, she finished 5th. During the season, she only jumped 1.90 m in April.

First major final (2007) and first olympic team (2008) 
During the 2007 season, Spencer won the NACAC Championships and took bronze at the Pan American Games behind Mexico's Romary Rifka and Canada's Nicole Forrester. Competing at her second senior 2007 World Championships in Osaka, Spencer made the final by equalling her own national record of 1.94 m. She finished 15th with 1.90 m in the final.

In 2008, Spencer, Dominic Johnson and Erma Gene Evans were the only three athletes representing Saint Lucia at the 2008 Summer Olympics. She did not make the final, only managing 1.85 m for 27th. Earlier in the season, she won the 2008 Central American and Caribbean Championships with a jump of 1.91 m.

Professional career
In 2009, Spencer signed her first professional contract with Stellar Group, becoming the first high jumper on their roster. She repeated as Central American and Caribbean champion in Havana, Cuba and signed an endorsement deal with Caribbean telecommunications provider LIME. She was featured on the cover of the 2010 LIME Services Directory.

After taking the gold medal at the 2009 Central American and Caribbean Championships in Athletics, Spencer was the sole Saint Lucian to qualify for the IAAF World Championships in Athletics in Berlin, but she failed to make the final. She also narrowly missed out on making the cut for the season-ending 2009 IAAF World Athletics Final, finishing ninth in the world for women's high jump. On 18 July 2009, she achieved her best jump of 1.95 m in Zaragoza.

On 8 May 2010, in Athens, Georgia, she cleared 1.98 m to cruise to a victory with what was at the time the second-best jump in the world for the 2010 season. The jump is the Saint Lucia National Record and the record for the Caribbean Community. With this result of 1.98 m, Spencer was the leading women's high jumper in the Commonwealth. At the Commonwealth Games in New Delhi, however, she needed two attempts to clear 1.88m, and eventually recorded Saint Lucia's best-ever individual finish at Commonwealth Games athletics with a bronze medal, joining Dominic Johnson, who took bronze in men's Pole Vault in 2002 in Manchester. In 2010, Spencer recorded six of the top ten best jumps of her career. She scored a victory at the 2010 CAC Games with a jump of 1.94 m and also had success on the European circuit, scoring five straight victories in Finland to scoop the 2010 Finnish Elite Games jackpot.

In 2011, she failed to make the final at the 2011 World Championships in Daegu, missing by one spot. In the IAAF Diamond League, she finished second with 1.92 m behind two-time reigning world champion Blanka Vlašić. After the world championships, she won her fifth consecutive Central American and Caribbean Championships in Mayagüez but finished in 7th place at the 2011 Pan American Games.

In 2012, Spencer was awarded an Olympic Solidarity Scholarship and began training in Germany. She qualified for the 2012 Summer Olympics in London but did not make the final, finishing 19th with 1.90 m.

In 2013, Spencer won a sixth gold medal at the Central American and Caribbean Championships in Athletics, jumping 1.95 m, her highest jump since 2010. At the World Championships in Moscow, she qualified for her second major final, thanks to a 1.92 m jump. She finished 11th in the final.

In 2014, Spencer made the finals at the World Indoor Championships with a new national indoor record of 1.95 m in the qualifying rounds, before finishing 7th in the final. This was her best performance at a world championship. Then, she cleared 1.96 m, her best jump since 2010, before successfully defending her Central American and Caribbean Games title in Veracruz, Mexico. She won bronze at the Commonwealth Games in Glasgow with 1.88 m. behind Australian Eleanor Patterson (1.94 m)and English jumper Isobel Pooley (1.92 m) She placed fifth at the Continental Cup. She won gold at the Pan Games Festival in Mexico City, Mexico. She placed second at the Organisation of Eastern Caribbean States Championships, behind Jeannelle Scheper, who also beat her at Saint Lucia's National Championships.

First olympic final (2016) 
Spencer qualified for the 2015 World Championships in Athletics in Beijing, and the 2016 Summer Olympics in Rio de Janeiro by clearing 1.94 m at the Meeting Madrid in July. She won the Saint Lucia National Championship with a height of 1.90 m. Along with Jeannelle Scheper, Spencer represented Saint Lucia at the 2015 Pan American Games. She won gold with a best height of 1.94 m. It was Saint Lucia's first gold medal ever at the Pan Am Games; the country had been represented at these Games six times since 1985 and then claimed the NACAC Championships title in San José, Costa Rica. At the World Championships, she again qualified for the final but finished in 12th place with 1.88 m.

On 13 February 2016, Spencer equalled her own national indoor record in Hustopeče, with 1.95 m. A month later, at the 2016 IAAF World Indoor Championships, she placed sixth with 1.93 m, three centimeters away from the gold medal, won by American Vashti Cunningham. On 30 April, she jumped a World Lead (WL) of 1.95 m in Des Moines, Iowa, before attacking 2.00 m., where she failed on three attempts.

On 14 May, at the IAAF Diamond League tour in Shanghai, she earned a victory with a jump of 1.94 m, on countback ahead of Uzbekistan's Nadiya Dusanova. In late June, she won the national title with 1.94 m. She competed in the qualifying round of the women's high jump at the Olympics in August and became the first Saint-Lucian athlete to qualify for the final. She finished in 6th place. Back in Saint Lucia, the local population came to celebrate her performance. Two weeks after the Olympics, she jumped 1.96 m at the Meeting de Paris to place second behind Ruth Beitia. At the end of the season, she finishes second in the IAAF Diamond League tournament, behind Beitia again.

In the 2017 season, Spencer's best jump was 1.92 m. At the 2017 World Championships in London, she was the only Saint-Lucian athlete. She failed to enter into the final, finishing in 13th place in the qualifying round.

In 2018, she decided to compete in the indoor season. For her first outing, she cleared the Commonwealth Games standard with 1.90 m. On 27 January, she won the high jump competition in Hustopeče with 1.93 m, the third best result in the world. Three days later, she equaled her national indoor record from 2014 and 2016 in Třinec, jumping 1.95 m and claiming victory. She competed at the 2018 NACAC Championships, winning a third consecutive title at 1.91m.

Retirement 
After the Tokyo Olympics, Spencer announced her retirement from athletics on 31 October 2021 at the age of 37.

Achievements

Personal bests

Outdoor progression

Honors and awards 
Spencer is a recipient of the following:
 -  - Medal of Merit (2016)

References

External links

1984 births
Living people
Saint Lucian high jumpers
Female high jumpers
Saint Lucian female athletes
Olympic athletes of Saint Lucia
Athletes (track and field) at the 2008 Summer Olympics
Athletes (track and field) at the 2012 Summer Olympics
Athletes (track and field) at the 2016 Summer Olympics
Athletes (track and field) at the 2020 Summer Olympics
Pan American Games medalists in athletics (track and field)
Pan American Games gold medalists for Saint Lucia
Pan American Games bronze medalists for Saint Lucia
Athletes (track and field) at the 2003 Pan American Games
Athletes (track and field) at the 2007 Pan American Games
Athletes (track and field) at the 2011 Pan American Games
Athletes (track and field) at the 2015 Pan American Games
Athletes (track and field) at the 2019 Pan American Games
Commonwealth Games gold medallists for Saint Lucia
Commonwealth Games bronze medallists for Saint Lucia
Commonwealth Games medallists in athletics
Athletes (track and field) at the 2002 Commonwealth Games
Athletes (track and field) at the 2006 Commonwealth Games
Athletes (track and field) at the 2010 Commonwealth Games
Athletes (track and field) at the 2014 Commonwealth Games
Athletes (track and field) at the 2018 Commonwealth Games
World Athletics Championships athletes for Saint Lucia
Central American and Caribbean Games gold medalists for Saint Lucia
Central American and Caribbean Games bronze medalists for Saint Lucia
Competitors at the 2006 Central American and Caribbean Games
Competitors at the 2010 Central American and Caribbean Games
Competitors at the 2014 Central American and Caribbean Games
Georgia Lady Bulldogs track and field athletes
Saint Lucian expatriates in the United States
Commonwealth Games gold medallists in athletics
Pan American Games gold medalists in athletics (track and field)
Central American and Caribbean Games medalists in athletics
Medalists at the 2007 Pan American Games
Medalists at the 2015 Pan American Games
Medalists at the 2019 Pan American Games
Medallists at the 2010 Commonwealth Games
Medallists at the 2014 Commonwealth Games
Medallists at the 2018 Commonwealth Games